Balmoral Castle is a residence of King Charles III in Aberdeenshire, Scotland.

Balmoral may also refer to:

Places

Australia 
 Balmoral, New South Wales, a locality of Sydney
 Balmoral, New South Wales (Lake Macquarie)
 Balmoral, New South Wales (Southern Highlands)
 Balmoral, Queensland
 Balmoral, Victoria

Belgium 
 Balmoral, a hamlet near the town of Spa, Belgium

Canada 
 Balmoral, British Columbia
 Balmoral, New Brunswick
 Balmoral Parish, New Brunswick
 Balmoral Mills, Nova Scotia
 Balmoral, Ontario, a community in Haldimand County
 Balmoral Grist Mill Museum, Balmoral Mills, Nova Scotia
 Balmoral, Manitoba

New Zealand 
 Balmoral, New Zealand, a suburb of Auckland

Northern Ireland 
 Balmoral (District Electoral Area), an area in south Belfast
 Balmoral railway station, Belfast
 Balmoral Golf Club, Belfast
 The Balmoral Show, an agricultural show that takes place annually near Belfast
 Balmoral Park, Lisburn, the new location of the Balmoral Show

Scotland 
 Balmoral, a suburb of Galashiels
The Balmoral Hotel in Edinburgh

South Africa 
 Balmoral, Mpumalanga, a village and colliery near Witbank

United States 
 Balmoral, Louisiana
 Balmoral, Maryland
 Balmoral, Tennessee
 Balmoral, Wisconsin
 Balmoral Park, Illinois, horse racing track in Crete, Illinois
 Lakewood Balmoral Historic District, Chicago, Illinois

Clothing 
 Balmoral bonnet, an unbrimmed cap common in Highland dress
 Balmoral (shoe), a type of men's dress shoe
 Balmoral tartan pattern worn by the British Royal Family

Education 
 Balmoral Hall School, Winnipeg, Canada
 Balmoral High School (Belfast, Northern Ireland)
 Balmoral Jr Secondary School, North Vancouver, British Columbia, Canada
Balmoral School, Auckland, New Zealand
 Balmoral State High School, Queensland, Australia

Food 
 Balmoral Chicken

Ships 
 , a passenger ship used for pleasure cruises in the UK
 , a cruise ship owned and operated by Fred. Olsen Cruise Lines

Theater 
 Balmoral (play), a 1987 play by Michael Frayn

See also 
 Balmoral Reef Plate, small tectonic plate in the Pacific Ocean north of Fiji
 Battle of Coral–Balmoral, a series of actions in May and June 1968 during the Vietnam War